Onde Balliya Hoogalu (Kannada: ಒಂದೇ ಬಳ್ಳಿಯ ಹೂಗಳು) is a 1967 Indian Kannada film, directed by M.Nageshwara Rao and M. S. Nayak and produced by Vanamala S. Nayak. The film stars K. S. Ashwath, Rajashankar, Balakrishna and Dikki Madhavarao in the lead roles. The film has musical score by Chellapilla Satyam. The film was a remake of the 1952 Tamil film En Thangai which was earlier remade in Hindi in 1959 as Chhoti Bahen and later in Telugu in 1967 as Aada Paduchu.

The film has many firsts. The first Kannada song by Mohammed Rafi who sang the ever popular "Neenelli nadeve Doora" and first Kannada song by K. J. Yesudas who sang another popular song "Daari Kaanade Bandavale". The film saw a resounding success commercially and also acclaimed for its simplistic portrayal of Brother Sister bonding.

In an  interview to Telugu and Kannada Film Director M.Nageshwara Rao, super star Rajinikanth told that he was a big fan of the film and had watched the film Onde Balliya Hoogalu 14 times during his growing up years in Bangalore and couldn't control the tears. M.Nageswara Rao incidentally had played a key role in recording the anecdotes of Shri Raghavendra swami during His life time and swami's travels to the length and breadth of the country. The impact of those anecdotes could be seen in the later version of Rajni's film on Raghavendra swami in Tamil.

Cast

K. S. Ashwath as Veerabhadra
Rajashankar
Balakrishna
Dikki Madhavarao
Ranga
B. M. Venkatesh
Ashwath Narayan
Muniyappa
Chandrakala as Rangi
Jayanthi in guest appearance
Pandari Bai in guest appearance
B. V. Radha
Rama
Annapurna
Bhujanga Rao
Srirangamurthy
Srinivasan
Ramachandra Rao
Nagaraj
Srinath as special appearance
Durgaprasad Rao

Soundtrack
The music was composed by Satyam.

References

1967 films
1960s Kannada-language films
Films scored by Satyam (composer)
Kannada remakes of Tamil films